The 2021–22 Vijay Hazare Trophy was the 20th season of the Vijay Hazare Trophy, a List A cricket tournament in India. It was played from 8 December 2021, and finished on 26 December 2021. Mumbai were the defending champions.

Originally, the tournament was scheduled to start on 23 February 2022, but was later preponed to 1 December 2021 and then postponed to 8 December 2021. The teams were initially divided into four groups, with nine teams each in Groups A and B, and ten each in Groups C and Plate. However, in August 2021, the Board of Control for Cricket in India (BCCI) announced that the tournament will be divided into six groups, with six teams in five Elite Groups and eight teams in the Plate Group. The winners of each Elite Group progressed directly to the quarter-finals, with the second-placed teams and the winner of the Plate Group playing in pre-quarters matches to determine the final eight teams.

Himachal Pradesh, Tamil Nadu, Saurashtra, Kerala and Services all won their respective groups to progress directly to the quarter-finals. Tripura won the Plate Group to progress to the preliminary quarter-finals. Vidarbha, Karnataka, Uttar Pradesh, Madhya Pradesh and Rajasthan also advanced to the preliminary quarter-finals, after finishing in second place in their respective groups.

On the first day of the quarter-finals, Himachal Pradesh beat Uttar Pradesh by five wickets, and Tamil Nadu beat Karnataka by 151 runs. In the other two quarter-final matches, Saurashtra beat Vidarbha by seven wickets, and Services beat Kerala, also by the margin of seven wickets. 

In the first semi-final, Himachal Pradesh beat Services by 77 runs to advance to the final. In the second semi-final, Tamil Nadu beat Saurashtra by two wickets to place their berth in the final.

Himachal Pradesh won the final match against Tamil Nadu by 11 runs to clinch their maiden domestic title.

League stage

Group A

Group B

Group C

Group D

Group E

Plate Group

Knockout stage

Preliminary quarter-finals

Quarter-finals

Semi-finals

Final

References

External links
 Series home at ESPN Cricinfo

Vijay Hazare Trophy
Vijay Hazare Trophy